is a Japanese sprint canoer who competed in the mid-1960s. He was eliminated in the repechages of the K-4 1000 m event at the 1964 Summer Olympics in Tokyo.

External links
Sports-reference.com profile

1935 births
Canoeists at the 1964 Summer Olympics
Japanese male canoeists
Living people
Olympic canoeists of Japan